The Electoral Administration Act 2006 is an Act of the Parliament of the United Kingdom, passed on 11 July 2006.

Among its main provisions, the Act:

 Provides a legislative framework for setting up a "Coordinated Online Record of Electors", known as "CORE", to co-ordinate electoral registration information across regions.
 Creates new criminal offences for supplying false electoral registration details or for failure to supply such details.
 Allows people to register anonymously on electoral registers if a 'safety test' is passed.
 Requires local authorities to review all polling stations, and to provide a report on the reviews to the Electoral Commission.
 Provides for the making of signature and date of birth checks on postal vote applications.
 Revises the law on "undue influence".
 Allows observers to monitor elections (with the exception of Scottish local government elections, which are the responsibility of the Scottish Parliament).
 Reduces the age of candidacy for public elections from 21 to 18.
 Allows for alterations to ballot paper designs, including the introduction of barcodes and pilot schemes for the introduction of photographs on ballot papers.
 Allows citizens of the Republic of Ireland and certain Commonwealth residents the right to stand in elections.
 Changes rules on how elections are run in the event of the death of a candidate, following the events in South Staffordshire at the 2005 general election.
 Provides for the entitlement of children to accompany parents and carers into polling stations.
 Bars candidates from using in their name or description expressions such as "Don't vote for them" or "None of the above".
 Bars candidates from standing in more than one constituency at the same election.
 Allows political parties up to 12 separate descriptions to be used on ballot papers, and allows joint candidature.
 Requires local authorities to promote and encourage electoral registration and voting.
 Amongst other provisions affecting members of the armed forces and other persons with a "service qualification", allows the Secretary of State to extend the period of validity (previously one year) of a "service declaration" by which qualified persons may have their names placed on the electoral register as "service voters"; the Act also imposes new duties upon the Ministry of Defence.
Removes the requirement for an observer to witness the signing of the security statement of a postal vote.
 Requires political parties to declare large loans. This provision was introduced as an amendment, surviving much parliamentary ping-pong, following the "Cash for Peerages" scandal. 

Some of its provisions came into effect upon it receiving assent, with other provisions commencing on other dates.

Coordinated Online Record of Electors
The proposed Coordinated Online Record of Electors was never established, and plans for it were shelved by the coalition government in 2011. The legal framework was later repealed by the Electoral Registration and Administration Act 2013.

References

External links
The Electoral Administration Act 2006, as amended from the National Archives.
The Electoral Administration Act 2006, as originally enacted from the National Archives.
Explanatory notes to the Electoral Administration Act 2006.
Department for Constitutional Affairs - Legislation - Electoral Administration Act 2006
House of Commons Library - Armed Forces Voting
Statutory Instrument 2006 No. 3412 (C. 128), a Statutory Instrument issued by the Secretary of State for Constitutional Affairs, 18 December 2006, bringing much of the Act into legal effect
Research on Electoral Administration

United Kingdom Acts of Parliament 2006
Election law in the United Kingdom
Election legislation